Shelly Beach is a coastal suburb of Townsville in the City of Townsville, Queensland, Australia. In the  Shelly Beach had a population of 0 people.

Geography 
As its name suggests, Shelly Beach is a coastal area with a sandy beach. It was named because it was an area used to collect shell grit. Despite being a suburb, it is undeveloped land within the Townsville Town Common Conservation Park with no road access other than tracks.

History 
The suburb's name derives from the shell grit along the sea shore.

In the  Shelly Beach had a population of 0 people.

References

Suburbs of Townsville